The British Association of Oral and Maxillofacial Surgeons is the British medical association for oral and maxillofacial (mouth, jaws and face) surgeons - dentists who are also trained in oral surgery.

History
Oral and maxillofacial surgery developed as a surgical development in dentistry to treat servicemen injured in World War 2.

The British Association of Oral Surgeons was formed in February 1962. In 1985 the organisation changed to its present name. In 1994 the field of surgery was recognised as one of the nine surgical specialities.

Since 1995, to gain entrance to the Specialist Register for the Speciality of Oral & Maxillofacial Surgery, a surgeon must have qualifications in dentistry and surgery - be a registered dentist and registered medical practitioner, according to the European Specialist Medical Qualification Order 1995. This recognition comes from both the General Medical Council and General Dental Council. Oral surgeons do not need to be a medical doctor.

It is a charity, and became a company limited by guarantee in 1997.

Structure
It is based at the Royal College of Surgeons of England, north of the London School of Economics, in the London Borough of Camden.

Function
It publishes the British Journal of Oral and Maxillofacial Surgery eight times a year.

References

External links
 BAOMS

Organisations based in the London Borough of Camden
Dental organisations based in the United Kingdom
Oral and maxillofacial surgery organizations
Organizations established in 1962
Surgical organisations based in the United Kingdom
1962 establishments in the United Kingdom